Lyclene hollowai is a moth of the family Erebidae. It was described by Jagbir Singh Kirti and Navneet Singh Gill in 2009 and can be found in Gujarat, India.

The wingspan is about 22 mm.

Etymology
The species is named in honour of Dr Jeremy D. Holloway.

References

Nudariina
Moths described in 2009
Moths of Asia